Retail services specialist (RS) is a rating in the United States Navy. RSes are responsible for managing and operating all shipboard retail and service activities, including the ship's store, vending machines, coffee kiosks (on aircraft carriers), barber shops and laundry operations. They play a large role in maintaining the morale aboard a ship.

History
The RS rating was established on October 1, 2019, with the renaming of the existing ship's serviceman (SH). The SH rating was established in 1943 in four specialty ratings: Ship's serviceman B (barber) (SSMB), ship's serviceman C (cobbler) (SSMC), ship's serviceman L (laundryman) (SSML) and ship's serviceman T (tailor) (SSMT). In April 1948, the four specialty ratings were merged into a single rating. The rating abbreviation was changed to SH. SHs specialized as barbers, cobblers, laundrymen, store clerks or tailors in pay grades E-3 and E-4.

Duties
Retail services specialists perform the following duties:

 Managing and operating retail and service activities afloat
 E-Commerce
 Procuring ship's store stock
 Receiving and managing retail inventory
 Maintaining financial records and accounting systems
 Maintaining inventory and procurement databases
 Managing and operating ship's barber shops
 Serving as Navy Cash Collections Agents
 Operating and maintaining vending and Navy Cash ATM machines
 Managing and operating ship's laundry services
 Hospitality services

References

External links
 Ship's Serviceman SH - usmilitary.about.com

United States Navy ratings